Marzo is an Italian and Spanish ((Castilian) or (Latin America)) surname. Marzo in both languages means March and the name originally indicated a special connection of its bearer to the third month of the year. Besides Spain and Italy its area of distribution includes most of the Spanish-speaking world and all countries with a considerable Italian diaspora.
Notable people with this name include:

Adrián Marzo (born 1968), Argentine athlete
Andrés Marzo (17th century), Spanish painter
Clay Marzo (born 1989), American surfer
Miong Marzo (born 1981), Filipino businessman
Pablo Pallares Marzo (born 1987), Spanish footballer
Ramón Sáez Marzo (1940–2013), Spanish road cyclist
Stefano Marzo (born 1991), Belgian footballer
Teresa De Marzo (1903–1986), Brazilian aviator

References

Italian-language surnames
Spanish-language surnames